Dragoslav Pavle Aksentijević (born 20 April 1942) is a Serbian icon and fresco painter, singer and conductor of Orthodox Christian sacred music and Serbian ethnic music. He is the founder (along with four musicians), conductor and artistic director of the "Zapis" (Inscription) ensemble. He was born in Belgrade.

Life
He received an M.A. degree in 1967 from Academy of Fine Arts in Belgrade.

Selected discography
Уметност флауте – i.e. The Art Of The Flute (along with group of artist's), LP - Album, PGP - RTB, 1981
Музика Старе Србије – i.e. Music of Old Serbia, LP, Album, PGP - RTB, 1987
Псалми 13. и 14. век – i.e. Psalms of 13 and 14 century, LP, Album, Yugoton, 1990

Awards
September 1988 - The First Award for the Interpretation of Byzantine melodies at the International Choir Festival in Kardica, Greece
January 1990 - Award at the International Festival in Moscow
1989 - Award from the Fund For Culture Of the City Of Belgrade
1990 - Golden Medal from the Serbian Society for Culture and Education
1990 - Award from Radio Innsbruck
2000 - Annual award from the Serbian Association Of Music Artists

See also
 List of painters from Serbia
 Divna Ljubojević

References

External links
 Dragoslav Pavle Aksentijević, The official channel of PGP - RTB (RTS)   
 Agios o Theos  - (Audio 1987) on YouTube Dragoslav Pavle Aksentijević, The official channel of PGP - RTB (RTS)
 Dragoslav Pavle Aksentijević & "Inscription" - (official video 2015) , The official YouTube channel of Dragoslav Pavle Aksentijevic 
 Dragoslav Pavle Aksentijević & "Inscription" ensemble - (Audio 2015), The official YouTube channel of PGP - RTB (RTS)

1942 births
Living people
20th-century Serbian male singers
Serbian painters
Artists from Belgrade
Musicians from Belgrade